is a senior high school in the city of Niigata, Niigata Prefecture, Japan. It is also called .

External links
  

High schools in Niigata Prefecture
Schools in Niigata Prefecture
Educational institutions established in 1892
1892 establishments in Japan
Niigata (city)